The Canada Business Corporations Act (CBCA) is an act of the Parliament of Canada regulating Canadian business corporations. Corporations in Canada may be incorporated federally, under the CBCA, or provincially under a similar provincial law.

Background
The act was legislated based on a report by a task force organized in 1967 to provide the first comprehensive review of federal corporate law since 1934. It received royal assent on 24 March 1975, and came into force on 15 December 1975.

It provides the basic corporate governance framework for many small and medium-sized Canadian enterprises as well as many of the largest corporations operating in Canada. Nearly 235,000 companies are incorporated under the act, including over 700 distributing or publicly held corporations. CBCA corporations make up approximately 50 percent of Canada's largest publicly traded business corporations.

As of June 25, 2019, the act was amended to require information about the diversity of directors and members of “senior management” be provided to shareholders. Diversity information and the rank of senior management captured by the new reporting requirements will apply to all distributing corporations.

See also
Canadian company law
List of Acts of Parliament of Canada

Further reading

References

External links
 

Canadian federal legislation
Canadian corporate law
1975 in Canadian law